Espionage is a subset of human intelligence, one of many intelligence collection methods, which are organized by intelligence collection management.

This lists is restricted to organizations that operate clandestine human sources in foreign countries and non-national groups. It does not include police organizations with domestic informers, or, on an international basis, human sources that do counterintelligence work alone.

References

Espionage
E
Intelligence analysis
Military intelligence
Intelligence agencies